Ture Sjölander (born 1937) is an early pioneer of computer animation. Beginning in 1964, his electronic images were being broadcast by Sveriges Television AB (SVT), the Swedish public broadcaster.

Productions from the SVT period include TIME (1965/66 Ture Sjolander and Bror Wikstrom), Monument (1968 with Lars Weck) and Space in the Brain (1969 Ture Sjolander, Bror Wikstrom, Sven Hoglund and Lasse Svanberg).

References

External links 
 Monument on YouTube
 The artist's website
 Biographical essay

Swedish animators
Swedish animated film directors
Swedish animated film producers
1937 births
Living people
Swedish photographers
People from Sundsvall